Mgombom is a town in the Abanga-Bigne Department of Moyen-Ogooué Province, in northwestern Gabon. It verges on the Equator on the Ogooue River on the  N3 road. The town of Mevang lies adjacent to Mgombom immediately to the west.

Populated places in Moyen-Ogooué Province
Abanga-Bigne Department